Sarah McLachlan is a Canadian singer-songwriter most known for founding the Lilith Fair women's music festival. She has released a total of six studio albums, being Surfacing her top selling album with more than 8 million copies in the U.S. alone, and another seven compilation and live albums. All of her recordings have been released through the Canadian-based Nettwerk Records and distributed by Arista Records. Her last three studio albums have reached the No. 1 place in the Canadian Albums Chart and the Top 10 on the Billboard 200. She has sold a total of 40 million copies worldwide.

To date McLachlan has received three Grammy Awards, where she's been nominated for all of her releases since 1995, a total of eight Juno Awards from her home country. She's also been awarded by the Billboard Music Awards, MuchMusic Video Awards, and the Western Canadian Music Awards. She also been included in numerous music lists by VH1 and the Rolling Stone magazine. McLachlan has also been appointed as Officer of the Order of Canada.

BDSCertified Spin Awards
Nielsen Broadcast Data Systems, better known as BDS, is a service that tracks monitored radio, television and internet airplay of songs based on the number of spins and detections.

|-
| 2003
| "I Will Remember You"
| 500,000 Spins 
|

BMI Pop Awards
Broadcast Music, Inc. (BMI) is one of three United States performing rights organizations, along with ASCAP and SESAC. It collects license fees on behalf of songwriters, composers, and music publishers and distributes them as royalties to those members whose works have been performed. 

|-
|rowspan=4|1999
| Herself
| Songwriter of the Year
| 
|-
| "Building a Mystery"
| rowspan=3|Award-Winning Song
| 
|-
| "Adia"
| 
|-
| "Sweet Surrender"
|

Beatport Music Awards
With its nominees based solely on Beatport sales data, The Beatport Music Awards aim to recognize electronic music talent.

|-
| 2008
| "Silence" (feat. Delerium) (Niels van Gogh vs Thomas Gold Remix)
| Best Progressive House Track
|

Billboard Year-End Magazine Awards
The Billboard Music Awards are an annual American awards show sponsored by the Billboard magazine awarding the top charting singles and artists.

Critics' Choice Awards
The Critics' Choice Award is an awards show presented annually by the Broadcast Film Critics Association to honor the finest in cinematic achievement. Sarah McLachlan has been nominated once.

Grammy Awards
The Grammy Awards were established in 1958 by the National Academy of Recording Arts and Sciences of the United States awarding the best in the music industry.

Helpmann Awards
The Helpmann Awards recognise distinguished artistic achievement and excellence in Australia's live performing arts sectors. 

|-
| 2004
| Afterglow 2004
| Best Contemporary Concert Presentation Theatre
|

International Dance Music Awards
The Winter Music Conference is a weeklong electronic music conference held annually, they host the International Dance Music Awards. Sarah McLachlan has received one nomination.

Juno Awards
The Juno Awards, the Canadian Grammys, are awarded annually to Canadian musicians by the Canadian Academy of Recording Arts and Sciences

MTV Video Music Awards
The MTV Video Music Awards were established by MTV in 1984 to award the top videos of the year.

Music Video Production Awards
The MVPA Awards are annually presented by a Los Angeles-based music trade organization to honor the year's best music videos.

|-
| 2005
| "World on Fire"
| Cross Promotion
|

MuchMusic Video Awards
The MuchMusic Video Awards are annual awards presented by the Canadian music video channel MuchMusic to honour the year's best music videos.

Polaris Music Prize
The Polaris Music Prize is awarded annually to one Canadian album.

|-
| 2016
| rowspan=4|Fumbling Towards Ecstasy
| rowspan=4|Heritage Award
| 
|-
| 2017
| 
|-
| 2018
| 
|-
| 2019
|

Western Canadian Music Awards
The Western Canadian Music Awards were established in 2003 by the Western Canada Music Alliance to honour the best of music in Western Canada.

Other recognition
 1999 – McLachlan ranked No. 69 on VH1's 100 Greatest Women of Rock & Roll.
 1999 – McLachlan was appointed as an Officer of the Order of Canada (OC).
 2001 - McLachlan was appointed as a Member of the Order of British Columbia (OBC) 
 2002 - Queen Elizabeth II Golden Jubilee Medal (Canadian Version).
 2007 – McLachlan's song "Building A Mystery" ranked No. 91 on the VH1's 100 Greatest Songs of the 90's
 2011 – Canadian Music Week, Allan Slaight Humanitarian Spirit Award
 2012 - Queen Elizabeth II Diamond Jubilee Medal (Canadian Version).
 2017 – Canadian Music Hall of Fame, Inducted

References

External links
 Official site

McLachlan, Sarah
Awards